Jinjiang Park is a station on Shanghai Metro Line 1. Before April 19, 2001 it was known as Hongmei Road station which is now the name of a different station on Line 12.

The station is part of the first southern extension of the line which opened on 10 April 1995. During the time the metro line was open for public testing this station was the southern terminus.

Places nearby 
 Jinjiang Action Park, an amusement park
 Meilong railway station (now closed)

References 

Shanghai Metro stations in Xuhui District
Line 1, Shanghai Metro
Railway stations in China opened in 1995
Railway stations in Shanghai